is a railway station in Yamatotakada, Nara Prefecture, Japan, operated by Kintetsu Railway.

Line
Matsuzuka Station is served by the Osaka Line.

Layout
The station has two side platforms serving one track each.

Platforms

Adjacent stations

See also
 List of railway stations in Japan

External links

  

Railway stations in Nara Prefecture